Apache CarbonData is a free and open-source column-oriented data storage format of the Apache Hadoop ecosystem. It is similar to the other columnar-storage file formats available in Hadoop namely RCFile and ORC. It is compatible with most of the data processing frameworks in the Hadoop environment. It provides efficient data compression and encoding schemes with enhanced performance to handle complex data in bulk.

History
CarbonData was developed at Huawei in 2013. The project was donated to the Apache Community in 2015 submitted to the Apache Incubator in June 2016. The project won top honors in the BlackDuck 2016 Open Source Rookies of the Year's Big Data category. Apache CarbonData has been a top-level Apache Software Foundation (ASF)-sponsored project since May 1, 2017.

See also

 Pig (programming tool)
 Apache Hive
 Apache Impala
 Apache Drill
 Apache Kudu
 Apache Spark
 Apache Thrift
 Apache Parquet
 Trino (SQL query engine)
 Presto (SQL query engine)

References

External links
 

2015 software
CarbonData
Cloud computing
Free system software
Hadoop
Software using the Apache license